Flack is a British dramedy television series. The first season, starring Anna Paquin, premiered on 21 February 2019 and consisted of six episodes.

On 2 August 2019, the series was renewed for a second season. It was scheduled to premiere on Pop in the U.S. on March 13, 2020, but was removed from the schedule after cutbacks by parent company ViacomCBS. In the UK, the show's website listed the second season as scheduled to run on W that March, before being changed to "Coming Soon". In late March 2020, the first season was made available through the video on demand platforms of Pop's sister network Showtime in the United States, though a confirmation of the network airing the second season has not been made. In June 2020, it was announced that the series would move to Amazon Prime Video for its second season. Series 2 became available for streaming on Prime Video on June 10, 2021.

The second season premiered in the UK on 13 April 2020, on W. and consists again of six episodes.

Premise
Robyn (Paquin) an American PR executive living in London, must figure out how to make the best of bad situations and somehow manage to get out unscathed. Robyn specialises in clearing up the monumental messes caused by her hapless and selfish clients. Although utterly in command of her job, her personal life is spinning out of control.

Cast

Main
Anna Paquin as Robyn, an American publicist living and working in London.
Sophie Okonedo as Caroline, Head of Mills Paulson
Genevieve Angelson as Ruth, Robyn's sister.
Lydia Wilson as Eve, Robyn's best friend and colleague at Mills Paulson.
Rebecca Benson as Melody, an intern at Mills Paulson.
Arinze Kene as Sam, a nurse and Robyn's boyfriend.
Marc Warren as Tom, a ballet dancer.
Rufus Jones as Mark, Ruth's husband.
Andrew Leung as Craig, an IT worker at Mills Paulson

Guest
Bradley Whitford as Calvin Cooper, a veteran director who Robyn reports for child pornography possession
Max Beesley as Anthony Henderson, a celebrity chef embroiled in several cheating scandals
Alan Davies as Dan Proctor, a stand-up comedian filmed making a transphobic outburst after being heckled during his routine
Rebecca Root as Allie Gregs, a transgender stand-up comedian who became the focus of a transphobic outburst from Dan Proctor
Amanda Abbington as Alexa, an actress who baselessly MeTooed a renowned nature presenter and environmentalist to advance her own career
Katherine Kelly as Brooke Love-Wells, a model fronting an anti-ageist advertising campaign photographed with scarring from cosmetic surgery
Sam Neill as Duncan Paulson, Caroline's ex-husband and the co-founder of Mills Paulson
Daniel Dae Kim as Gabriel Cole, an electric aircraft innovator who Eve briefly dates.
Rebecca Scroggs as Abigail Reese, an entertainment reporter and one of Robyn's former flames
Dinita Gohil as Narinda
Toby-Alexander Smith as Terry
Aude des Pallieres as Sofi Adjani, a temperamental fashion model who assaulted a club patron unprovoked 
John Askew as Darren Barron, a Formula 1 driver forced to lie about being infertile after his wife cheated on him with basketball player Kadell James
Sophia La Porter as Roxy Barron, the wife of Darren Barron whose affair with Kadell James resulted in her becoming pregnant

Episodes

Series 1 (2019)

Series 2 (2020)

Reception
On the review aggregator website Rotten Tomatoes, the series holds an approval rating of 73% with an average rating of 6.1/10, based on 26 reviews. The website's critical consensus reads, "Audiences looking for an arsenic cookie of a series may cut Flack some slack, but its cynical take on publicity is exacerbated by hyperbolically unpleasant, underdeveloped characters." Metacritic, which uses a weighted average, assigned the series a score of 58 out of 100, based on 13 critics, indicating "mixed or average reviews".

References

External links

2010s American comedy-drama television series
2020s American comedy-drama television series
2019 American television series debuts
2020 American television series endings
2010s British comedy-drama television series
2020s British comedy-drama television series
2010s British workplace comedy television series
2010s British workplace drama television series
2020s British workplace comedy television series
2020s British workplace drama television series
2019 British television series debuts
2020 British television series endings
Pop (American TV channel) original programming
UKTV original programming
Television series by Hat Trick Productions
English-language television shows
Television shows set in the United Kingdom
Works about public relations
2010s American workplace comedy television series
2010s American workplace drama television series
2020s American workplace comedy television series
2020s American workplace drama television series
Office work in popular culture